District council elections were held for the first time in Brunei on 30 and 31 August 1962. A total of 55 seats on the four district councils were contested by the Brunei People's Party (55 candidates), the Brunei National Organisation (6), the Brunei United Party (1) and eighteen independents. The BPP won 54 seats (32 uncontested), whilst the sole independent elected later joined the party. Voter turnout was around 89%.

The 1959 constitution had created a 33-seat Legislative Council, of which 16 were to be indirectly elected by the district councils (nine were to be appointed by the Sultan, whilst eight were ex officio). As all district council seats were held by BPP members, it was expected that the party would take up all 16 seats. However, the government postponed the opening of the Council, and suspended it after the outbreak of the Brunei Revolt in December.

Overall results

References

Elections in Brunei
Brunei
District
Election and referendum articles with incomplete results